Malott is a census-designated place (CDP) in Okanogan County, Washington, United States, within the Greater Omak Area. The population was 487 at the 2010 census.

Malott sits on the western bank of the Okanogan River and has bridge access to U.S. Route 97.  It has a general store, bar and church. The community took its name from L.C. Malott, who first settled in the area in 1886. The town was established in 1890 and platted in 1909.  Originally a stopover point with a hotel, most of the town was destroyed by flooding in 1938 after a dam burst on Loop Loop Creek. Malott was evacuated in July 2014 due to the approaching Carlton Complex wildfires.

Climate
This climatic region is typified by large seasonal temperature differences, with warm to hot (and often humid) summers and cold (sometimes severely cold) winters.  According to the Köppen Climate Classification system, Malott has a humid continental climate, abbreviated "Dsb" on climate maps.

References

External links

Census-designated places in Okanogan County, Washington
Census-designated places in Washington (state)
Washington (state) populated places on the Okanogan River
Populated places in Greater Omak
Populated places in the Okanagan Country